Sana'a was a patrol boat built at Bollinger Shipyards for the Coast Guard of Yemen. She has one sister ship, . The vessels use the same design as the United States Coast Guard's s. US vessels are, in turn, based on the Damen Stan 2600, designed by Damen Group.

Sana'a sank on 9 March 2017 after possibly striking a naval mine.

References

Marine Protector-class coastal patrol boats
Patrol vessels of Yemen
2011 ships
Ships built in Lockport, Louisiana